Stubel Hill (‘Stubelski Halm’ \'stu-bel-ski 'h&lm\) is the ice-covered hill rising to 479 m and forming the north extremity of Marescot Ridge on Trinity Peninsula in Graham Land, Antarctica.  It is overlooking Bransfield Strait to the north.

The hill is named after the settlements of Stubel in Northwestern Bulgaria.

Location
German-British mapping in 1996.

Maps
 Trinity Peninsula. Scale 1:250000 topographic map No. 5697. Institut für Angewandte Geodäsie and British Antarctic Survey, 1996.
 Antarctic Digital Database (ADD). Scale 1:250000 topographic map of Antarctica. Scientific Committee on Antarctic Research (SCAR). Since 1993, regularly updated.

Notes

References
 Stubel Hill. SCAR Composite Antarctic Gazetteer
 Bulgarian Antarctic Gazetteer. Antarctic Place-names Commission. (details in Bulgarian, basic data in English)

External links
 Stubel Hill. Copernix satellite image

Hills of Trinity Peninsula
Bulgaria and the Antarctic